The Ghana-Lebanon Islamic School (GLIS) complex is a private non-profit institution in Accra founded in 2000 and commissioned in May 2001 by the then vice president of Ghana, Aliu Mahama. The school consist of Primary School, Junior High School (JHS), Senior High School (SHS) and an Arabic Studies Unit (ASU).

History
Ghana-Lebanon Islamic School Complex (GLIS) was founded in January 2000 and commissioned on 19 May 2001 by the late Vice President of the Republic of Ghana, Alhaji Aliu Mahama. It started as Ghana-Lebanon Islamic Secondary School (GLISS) with only a few courses before expanding further to include Junior High School and Primary School. The school is owned and managed by the Ghana Islamic Society for Education and Reformation (GISER), a group made up of mainly Lebanese business persons working in Ghana. The school was established as part of GISER's corporate social responsibility.

References

Schools in Accra
High schools in Ghana
International schools in Ghana
Education in Accra
Private schools
Schools in Africa
Greater Accra Region
Mixed schools in Ghana
Islam